Bréville may refer:

Communes in France
 Bréville, Charente
 Bréville-les-Monts, in the Calvados département
 Bréville-sur-Mer, in the Manche département

Other uses
 Breville Group or Breville, an Australian manufacturer of small home appliances
 Breville, a brand of Breville Group
 Pierre de Bréville (1861–1949), French composer
 Louis Breville (1918–1928), a chief engineer with Chemins de Fer du Nord

See also
 Brévillers (disambiguation)
 Brévilly